The 2015 Bowling Green Falcons football team represented Bowling Green State University in the 2015 NCAA Division I FBS football season. The Falcons played their home games at Doyt Perry Stadium. They were led by second-year head coach Dino Babers and were members of the East Division of the Mid-American Conference. They finished the season 10–4, 7–1 in MAC play to be champions of the East Division. They represented the East Division in the MAC Championship where they defeated Northern Illinois to become MAC champions. They were invited to the GoDaddy Bowl where they lost to Georgia Southern.

Schedule

Roster

Game summaries

vs Tennessee

at Maryland

Memphis

at Purdue

at Buffalo

Massachusetts

Akron

at Kent State

Ohio

at Western Michigan

Toledo

at Ball State

Northern Illinois–MAC Championship Game

Georgia Southern–GoDaddy Bowl

References

Bowling Green
Bowling Green Falcons football seasons
Mid-American Conference football champion seasons
Bowling Green Falcons football